El Miedo a la Libertad is the second studio by Buenos Aires-based electronic neo-tango band Tanghetto, or the third, considering that their side project Hybrid Tango (2004) is in fact part of their official discography, as well as part of their regular live repertoire. The album was released in March 2008.

The album is named after German psychologist Erich Fromm's famous book, Fear of Freedom. It's an instrumental record, and to the usual combination of tango and electronica, elements from jazz and more acoustic sounds are added to the blend.

The music of El Miedo a la Libertad balances electronically generated sounds and acoustic instruments like bandoneón, piano, violin, erhu, acoustic drums and guitar.  The album was produced by Max Masri and coproduced by Diego S. Velázquez.

Like its predecessor, Buenos Aires Remixed, this album also features a selection of cover versions of music pieces from diverse styles performed in the unique style of the band. The covers included in this release are Eurythmics' Sweet Dreams (Are Made of This), Sting's Englishman in New York and Herbie Hancock's 1964 jazz standard Cantaloupe Island.

In 2009 the album achieved a Gardel Award.

Track listing 
 El Testigo (5:04)
 Buscando Camorra (4:22)
 Sweet Dreams (Are Made of This) (3:56)
 El Arte de Amar (4:09)
 Viajero Inmóvil (3:05)
 Englishman in New York (A bandoneonist in New York) (3:38)
 ¿Alguien se acuerda del Mayo Francés? (3:53)
 Media Persona (3:52)
 Cantaloupe Island (4:14)
 La Deuda Interna (4:58)
 El Desvío (4:01)
 El Miedo a la Libertad (4:59)

Personnel 
 Max Masri: synthesizers and programming
 Diego S. Velázquez: nylon-string guitar, metallophone
 Chao Xu: violoncello and erhu
 Federico Vazquez: bandoneon
 Antonio Boyadjian: acoustic and electric piano
 Daniel Corrado: acoustic/electronic drums and percussion
 Esteban Morgado: nylon-string guitar (guest musician)
 Quique Condomí: violin (guest musician)

2008 albums
Tanghetto albums